Raadha is a popular Bengali television Soap Opera that premiered on October 31, 2016, and airs on Zee Bangla. It is produced by Surinder Films and stars Aemila Sadhukhan and Ravi Shaw in lead roles and Monalisa Paul as the main antagonist. The show telecasts at Monday to Friday at 10:30 pm. The show aired at 6:00 pm, until it got a new timeslot at 10:30 pm because of Joyee replacing its old timeslot. The show went off air on 8 December 2017. It was replaced by Rangiye Diye Jao.

Cast 
 Aemila Sadhukhan as Radharani Banerjee aka Raadha /Sonali Jaiswal
 Ravi Shaw as Krishna Raj Banerjee aka Krish
 Rupsa Chatterjee as Zaara Basu
 Dolly Basu as Shobha Banerjee / Abha (Double Role): Krish & Kakon's mother, Shobha's sister ( Krish and Kakon's aunt)
 Anindita Bose as Konkona/Kakon; Krish's sister
 Bodhisatwa Mukherjee as Subhendu Banerjee; Krish & Kakon's father
 Rohit Mukherjee as Dulal Bera; Raadha, Beena & Lokkhi's father,  Monorama's husband
 Tanuka Chatterjee as Monoroma; Radha's step mother & Beena-Lokkhi's mother, Dulal's second wife 
 Shakuntala Barua as Krish's Grandmother
 Biplab Banerjee as Dibyendu Banerjee 
 Abanti Dutta as Ramola Banerjee
 Jayashree Mukherjee Kaul as Shiuli Banerjee
 Nibedita Biswas / Soumi Chakraborty as Beena ; Dulal's and Monorama's daughter, Lokkhi's elder sister, Radha's step and Younger Sister
 Sakshi Dona Saha as Lokkhi ;Dulal and Monorama's second daughter, Beena's younger sister, Radha's step and Younger sister.
 Sohan Bandopadhyay as Siddhartha; Zaara's father
 Anindita Saha Kapileshwari as Anamika; Zaara's mother
 Tathagata Mukherjee as Ronojoy Sanyal
 Kaushambi Chakraborty as Rupsha
 Monalisa Paul as Sunny 
 Sonamana Arinsha as Muskaan
Ahmad Harhash as Arun Mehra

References

External links 
Official Website

2016 Indian television series debuts
Bengali-language television programming in India
Zee Bangla original programming